For other places with the same name see Raipur (disambiguation)
Raipur is a village under Raipur–Supur gram panchayat of Bolpur Sriniketan block in Bolpur subdivision of  Birbhum district in the Indian state of West Bengal.

History
In 1863, Debendranath Tagore took on permanent lease  of land, with two chhatim trees, at a yearly payment of Rs. 5,  from Bhuban Mohan Sinha, the talukdar of Raipur. He built a guest house and named it Santiniketan (the abode of peace). Gradually, the whole area came to be known as Santiniketan.

Satyendra Prasanno Sinha, a subsequent talukdar of Raipur, was elevated to the peerage as Baron Sinha, of Raipur, in 1919, becoming the first Indian member of the British House of Lords.

Geography

Location

The village lies on the road that bypasses the town of bolpur and is near to the BITM.

Note: The map alongside presents some of the notable locations in the area. All places marked in the map are linked in the larger full screen map.

Physical features
Raipur is located in the south-eastern corner of the district which is an alluvial plain between Ajay and Mayurakshi Rivers. It has hot and dry summers, spread over March – May, followed by the monsoon from June to September. 78 per cent of the rainfall occurs during this period.

Demographics
As per the 2011 Census of India, Raipur had a total population of 2,320 of which 1,195 (52%) were males and 1,125 (48%) were females. Population below 6 years was 246. The total number of literates in Raipur was 1,613 (77.77% of the population over 6 years).

In 2001, Raipur had an area of 37 ha and a population of 2,063, of which 987 belong to scheduled castes and 149 to scheduled tribes.

Tourist Interest
The ruins of the ancestral house of Bhuban Mohan Singha still stands at the end of the village. Tourists bound for Bolpur-Sriniketan-Santiniketan may easily pay a visit to this site. The grandeur and vast expanse of the once stately mansion can still be recognized.

References

Villages in Birbhum district